Methylobacterium persicinum  is a Gram-negative, facultatively methylotrophic, strictly aerobic and non-spore-forming bacteria from the genus of Methylobacterium which has been isolated from water from a food factory in Japan.

References

Further reading

External links
Type strain of Methylobacterium persicinum at BacDive -  the Bacterial Diversity Metadatabase

Hyphomicrobiales
Bacteria described in 2008